Kabali Vishwanth is an Indian actor who has appeared in Tamil language films. After appearing in small supporting roles and working as an assistant choreographer, he made his breakthrough as an actor with a supporting role in Pa. Ranjith's Kabali (2016).

Career 
Vishwanath started his career playing an anti-hero in S. A. Chandrasekhar's Veluthu Kattu (2010). He then portrayed small supporting roles in films including as Arun Vijay's friend in Thadaiyara Thaakka (2012), as Dinesh's elder brother in Attakathi (2012), and as Prakash Raj's neighbour in Dhoni (2012). He later moved on to assist dance choreographer Sridhar in films.

Vishwanath made a breakthrough as an actor after portraying a role in Pa. Ranjith's Kabali (2016), which starred Rajinikanth in the lead role. The film saw him credited as Vishwanth, and he subsequently kept the name for his future work. Portraying a Chennai-based gangster hired to protect Rajinikanth's lead character, the film and his role won acclaim. The high-profile nature of the film prompted several film makers to sign him on for their productions, and notably later worked on Sketch (2018) alongside Vikram and Linguswamy's Sandakozhi 2 (2018), portraying the husband of Varalaxmi Sarathkumar's character. He also worked on a Hindi-language film as well as portraying his first lead role in the horror-comedy, Onaaigal Jakkiradhai (2018). He portrayed Vikram's friend in Sketch.

Filmography

References

External links 

Indian male film actors
Male actors in Tamil cinema
Living people
21st-century Indian male actors
Year of birth missing (living people)